Cornelis Marius Viruly (11 November 1875 – 23 September 1938) was a Dutch sport shooter who competed in the 1908 Summer Olympics.

He was born in Vuren and died in Amsterdam.

In 1908 he finished fourth with the Dutch team in the team trap shooting event. In the individual trap competition he finished 14th.

References

External links
list of Dutch shooters

1875 births
1938 deaths
People from Lingewaal
Dutch male sport shooters
Olympic shooters of the Netherlands
Shooters at the 1908 Summer Olympics
Trap and double trap shooters
Sportspeople from Gelderland